Rocker is the third studio album by Serbian heavy metal band Kraljevski Apartman. For the first time in the band's history, an official keyboard player was brought in substituting the second guitar. The band presented a heavy but at the same time a melodic approach to their music with heavy-riff songs and power ballads. The band recorded eleven new songs plus one bonus track from Labyrinth movie soundtrack. The album featured ballad "Dama iz kraljevskog apartmana" which became their stamp for the future, "Ranjena zver" (for which the band recorded a promotional video), glam metal-oriented "Vino, viski i Rock 'n' Roll" and "Za ljubav ne treba da moliš" which became classics and considered unskipable on live appearances. The track "Niemansland" was written in German language and Zdravković provided the vocals. This is the first Kraljevski Apartman track on foreign language and not sung by Lalović.

Track listing 
All songs were written by Zoran Zdravković except where noted.

"Ranjena zver" - 4:06
"Ne traži milost" - 5:32
"Rocker" - 2:24
"Znam da život kratko traje" - 3:57
"Dama iz kraljevskog apartmana" - 3:56
"Za ljubav ne treba da moliš" - 5:54
"Nije sve crno" - 3:11
"Neću da stanem na pola puta" - 4:11
"Vino, viski i Rock 'n' Roll" - 3:43
"Niemandsland" (R. Schreiner, Z. Zdravković) - 2:39
"Crni konjanici" (M. Milatović, Z. Zdravković) - 2:55

Bonus tracks 
"U lavirintu sedam greha" (Bonus track from the Labyrinth movie soundtrack) - 4:12

Personnel 
Zoran Lalović - vocals
Zoran Zdravković - guitar
Zoran Rončević - drums
Marko Nikolić - bass
Dejan Đorđević - keyboards

References

Kraljevski Apartman albums
2002 albums